The Shakey's V-League 11th Season: Open Conference was the 20th conference of Shakey's V-League held between June 29, 2014, to August 31, 2014. The opening ceremonies were held on June 29, 2014, with the first doubleheader of volleyball games at the Filoil Flying V Arena in San Juan. There were eight (8) teams that competed, with the Philippine Army Lady Troopers emerging as the tournament's champion.

Tournament Format

Preliminaries (PL)

Eight (8) competing teams had a Single Round-robin. Top six (6) teams qualified for the Quarterfinals.

Quarterfinals (QF)

The top six (6) teams battled for the top four (4) spots in a Single Round-robin with their scores from the preliminaries carried over, minus the ones won over the eliminated teams.

Semi-finals (SF)

The four (4) semi-finalists will compete against each other in a best-of-three series as follows: C1 vs D2 and D1 vs C2.
The two (2) SF winners will compete for GOLD.
The two (2) SF losers will compete for BRONZE

Finals
The battle for GOLD and the battle for BRONZE will both follow the best-of-three format, provided:
If the battle for GOLD ends in two (2) matches (2-0), then there will no longer be Game 3 for either GOLD or BRONZE.
If, in the case, the series for BRONZE is tied (1-1), then the tie will be resolved using FIVB rules.
A tie in the series for GOLD (1-1) after Game 2 will be broken in a Game 3, regardless of the results of the series in BRONZE.

Participating Teams

Season's Line-Up (Regular Players)

Preliminaries

|}

|}

Bracket

Quarterfinals

  

|}

|}

Play-off

|}

Semi-finals

Rank 1 vs Rank 4

Rank 2 vs Rank 3

Finals

Battle for Bronze

Battle for Gold

Final standings

Individual awards
 Most Valuable Player
 Conference: Rachel Anne Daquis (PAR)
 Finals: Jovelyn Gonzaga (PAR)
 Best Scorer: Alyssa Valdez (ADMU)
 Best Attacker: Alyja Daphne Santiago (NU)
 Best Blocker: Maika Angela Ortiz (PAF)
 Best Server: Rachel Anne Daquis (PAR)
 Best Digger: Shiela Marie Pineda (CAG)
 Best Setter: Rhea Katrina Dimaculangan (PAF)
 Best Receiver: Lizlee Ann Gata-Pantone (PLDT)

References

External links
 www.v-league.ph - Official website
 www.vleague.tk

Shakey's V-League conferences